The 2019 Breckland District Council election took place on 2 May 2019 to elect members of Breckland District Council in England. This was on the same day as other local elections. The boundaries for this election were the same as those used in 2015.

The Conservative Party held the council with a very large majority, losing one seat to the Green Party (who also won an independent seat and thereby gained their first ever seats in the district) and three to independent candidates, though they gained one seat from UKIP. UKIP lost all four of its seats, with the remaining three being taken by the Labour Party, which became the second largest party on the council with six seats.

Summary

Election result

|-

Total votes cast: 48,280.

In addition to the elections, a referendum was held on the Swaffham neighbourhood plan. This passed 1,572 votes in favour (81.5%) to 334 votes against (18.5%). 1,930 ballot papers were issued and the turnout was 30.5%.

Breckland Politics 2015-2019

After the 2015 election, 42 councillors were Conservatives, 4 were UKIP, 2 Labour, and 1 independent. This had changed by 2015 in the following ways:

The Conservatives retained control of the council with a sizeable majority throughout this period, despite losing four councillors. The changes were caused by three defections or resignations from the Conservative group, one seat change in a by-election, and one death shortly before the 2019 election. Two Conservative councillors left to sit as independents. One was Pablo Dimoglou of Mattishall, who resigned after accusing Council leader William Nunn of an undisclosed connection to the ownership of a local golf club in which the council had invested, before apologising for the allegation and resigning from the group; the other was Thomas Monument of Dereham Withburga, who was found guilty of assault after head-butting and punching an ex girlfriend. One Conservative (John Rogers of Saham Toney) left to sit as a Unionist. There was also a Labour gain from the Conservatives in a by-election in the Thetford Priory ward in September 2017. A UKIP councillor, John Newton of Castle Ward in, died in January 2019; his seat was not filled by a by-election due to the close proximity of this election.

There were also a number of Conservative holds in by-elections: Attleborough Queens & Besthorpe in 2016, and Harling & Heathlands and Saham Toney in 2017.

In the run-up to the 2019 election, the parties nominated a variable number of candidates. The Conservatives again by a wide margin nominated the most candidates, this time nominating one fewer than in 2015 and thus failing to contest just two of the 49 council seats. The Labour Party nominated 31 candidates, up from a previous 25, being the only party to significantly increase their candidate total. This was a major factor in far fewer wards being uncontested than in 2015. There were also more independent candidates, a total of eight, up from a previous total of three. The Green party meanwhile nominated two fewer candidates; the largest drop in candidate numbers was seen by UKIP, who having stood eighteen candidates previously now only stood two. The Liberal Democrats further decreased their number of candidates from two to one.

Unlike in 2015, none of the council's 27 wards were uncontested.

Full results by ward

Note: Anthony Crouch also contested this seat for UKIP in 2015, getting 23.1% on that occasion.

By-elections

Hermitage

Thetford Boudica

References

2019 English local elections
May 2019 events in the United Kingdom
2019
2010s in Norfolk